Delco may refer to:

Places
 Often, Delaware County, Pennsylvania
 Delta County, Colorado
 Delta County, Michigan
 Delco, North Carolina
 Delaware County, Ohio
 Delaware County, Iowa

Companies
 Delco Electronics
Delco ignition system
 ACDelco

People with the surname
Wilhelmina Ruth Delco (born 1929), American politician